Chlorosarcinaceae is a family of chlorophyte green algae, in the order Chlamydomonadales.

Genera
, AlgaeBase accepted the following genera:
Borodinella V.V.Miller – 1 species
Chlorosarcina Gerneck – 6 species
Chlorosarcinopsis Herndon – 12 species
Chlorosphaera Klebs – 1 species
Chlorosphaeropsis Vischer – 3 species
Desmotetra T.R.Deason & G.L.Floyd – 4 species
Entophysa M.Möbius – 1 species
Neochlorosarcina Shin Watanabe – 7 species
Pleurastrosarcina H.J.Sluiman & P.C.J.Blommers – 1 species
Polysphaera Reisigl – 1 species
Possonia F.Hindak – 1 species
Pseudotetracystis R.D.Arneson – 3 species
Sarcinochlamys Shin Watanabe – 1 species
Symbiococcum M.Rahat & V.Reich – 1 species

References

Chlamydomonadales
Chlorophyceae families